In logic and linguistics, a metalanguage is a language used to describe another language, often called the object language. Expressions in a metalanguage are often distinguished from those in the object language by the use of italics, quotation marks, or writing on a separate line. The structure of sentences and phrases in a metalanguage can be described by a metasyntax. For example, to say that the word "noun" can be used as a noun in a sentence, one could write "noun" is a <noun>.

Types of metalanguage

There are a variety of recognized types of metalanguage, including embedded, ordered, and nested (or hierarchical) metalanguages.

Embedded 

An embedded metalanguage is a language formally, naturally and firmly fixed in an object language. This idea is found in Douglas Hofstadter's book, Gödel, Escher, Bach, in a discussion of the relationship between formal languages and number theory: "... it is in the nature of any formalization of number theory that its metalanguage is embedded within it."

It occurs in natural, or informal, languages, as well—such as in English, where words such as noun, verb, or even word describe features and concepts pertaining to the English language itself.

Ordered 

An ordered metalanguage is analogous to an ordered logic. An example of an ordered metalanguage is the construction of one metalanguage to discuss an object language, followed by the creation of another metalanguage to discuss the first, etc.

Nested 

A nested (or hierarchical) metalanguage is similar to an ordered metalanguage in that each level represents a greater degree of abstraction. However, a nested metalanguage differs from an ordered one in that each level includes the one below.

The paradigmatic example of a nested metalanguage comes from the Linnean taxonomic system in biology. Each level in the system incorporates the one below it. The language used to discuss genus is also used to discuss species; the one used to discuss orders is also used to discuss genera, etc., up to kingdoms.

In natural language 

Natural language combines nested and ordered metalanguages. In a natural language there is an infinite regress of metalanguages, each with more specialized vocabulary and simpler syntax.

Since all these metalanguages are sublanguages of  they are all embedded languages with respect to the language as a whole.

Metalanguages of formal systems all resolve ultimately to natural language, the 'common parlance' in which mathematicians and logicians converse to define their terms and operations and 'read out' their formulae.

Types of expressions 
There are several entities commonly expressed in a metalanguage. In logic usually the object language that the metalanguage is discussing is a formal language, and very often the metalanguage as well.

Deductive systems 

A deductive system (or, deductive apparatus of a formal system) consists of the axioms (or axiom schemata) and rules of inference that can be used to derive the theorems of the system.

Metavariables 

A metavariable (or metalinguistic or metasyntactic variable) is a symbol or set of symbols in a metalanguage which stands for a symbol or set of symbols in some object language. For instance, in the sentence:

Let A and B be arbitrary formulas of a formal language .

The symbols A and B are not symbols of the object language , they are metavariables in the metalanguage (in this case, English) that is discussing the object language .

Metatheories and metatheorems 

A metatheory is a theory whose subject matter is some other theory (a theory about a theory). Statements made in the metatheory about the theory are called metatheorems. A metatheorem is a true statement about a formal system expressed in a metalanguage. Unlike theorems proved within a given formal system, a metatheorem is proved within a metatheory, and may reference concepts that are present in the metatheory but not the object theory.

Interpretations 

An interpretation is an assignment of meanings to the symbols and words of a language.

Role in metaphor 

Michael J. Reddy (1979) argues that much of the language we use to talk about language is conceptualized and structured by what he refers to as the conduit metaphor. This paradigm operates through two distinct, related frameworks.

The major framework views language as a sealed pipeline between people:

The minor framework views language as an open pipe spilling mental content into the void:

Metaprogramming 

Computers follow programs, sets of instructions in a formal language. The development of a programming language involves the use of a metalanguage. The act of working with metalanguages in programming is known as metaprogramming.

Backus–Naur form, developed in the 1960s by John Backus and Peter Naur, is one of the earliest metalanguages used in computing. Examples of modern-day programming languages which commonly find use in metaprogramming include ML, Lisp, m4, and Yacc.

See also 

 Category theory
 Jakobson's functions of language
 Language-oriented programming
 Meta-communication
 Metaethics
 Metafiction
 Metagraphy
 Metamathematics
 Metalinguistic abstraction
 Metalocutionary act
 Metaphilosophy
 Natural semantic metalanguage
 Nested quotation
 Paralanguage
 Self-reference
 Use–mention distinction

Dictionaries 

Audi, R. 1996. The Cambridge Dictionary of Philosophy. Cambridge: Cambridge University Press.
Baldick, C. 1996. Oxford Concise Dictionary of Literary Terms. Oxford: Oxford University Press.
Cuddon, J. A. 1999. The Penguin Dictionary of Literary Terms and Literary Theory. London: Penguin Books.
Honderich, T. 1995. The Oxford Companion to Philosophy. Oxford: Oxford University Press.
Matthews, P. H. 1997. The Concise Oxford Dictionary of Linguistics. Oxford: Oxford University Press. .
McArthur, T. 1996. The Concise Oxford Companion to the English Language. Oxford: Oxford University Press.

References

External links

 Metalanguage, Principia Cybernetica.
 Willard McCarty (submitted 2006) Problematic Metaphors, Humanist Discussion Group, Vol. 20, No. 92.

Metalogic
Linguistics
Linguistics terminology
Metalanguages
Proof theory